Steinbecke may refer to:

Steinbecke (Möhne), a river of North Rhine-Westphalia, Germany, tributary of the Möhne
Steinbecke (Valme), a river of North Rhine-Westphalia, Germany, tributary of the Valme

See also
Steinbeke